James Dean Bradfield is a Welsh singer-songwriter, musician and record producer. He is known for being the lead vocalist and guitarist for the Welsh alternative rock band Manic Street Preachers.

Biography

Early life 
Born in Tredegar, Monmouthshire, Bradfield attended the local Oakdale Comprehensive School where he suffered years of cruelty and bullying (he claims he was "a Woody Allen-esque little nerd") for his name (nicknamed Crossfire), lazy eye, musical bend and small size. James formed a close relationship with three friends: his cousin Sean Moore, who lived with James and his family throughout their childhood after his own parents' divorce, and future bandmates Nicky Wire and Richey Edwards.

Bradfield loved to run and was a steeplechaser, and soon grew fond of punk rock band The Clash, although his earliest musical love was ELO. He gave up his dream of "being like Napoleon" and decided that he wanted to be a rock star. He learnt to play guitar by learning how to play Guns N' Roses's Appetite for Destruction with the curtains drawn in his parents' front room.

Solo career 

In late April 2006, a track from Bradfield's debut solo single entitled "That's No Way to Tell a Lie" premiered on Janice Long's show on BBC Radio 2. It became the first single from the album and was released on 10 July while the album, entitled The Great Western, was released on 24 July. The single debuted at No. 18 in the UK Singles Chart while the album debuted at No. 22 on the album chart. The positions were considered relatively successful considering the lack of promotion.

In support of the album, Bradfield played a series of solo gigs in May 2006 in Manchester, Glasgow, Dundee, Nottingham, Birmingham, and London. The setlists consisted of tracks from The Great Western as well as several Manics tracks including "This Is Yesterday" and "Ocean Spray". He also played one further date at London ULU in June 2006, featuring a similar setlist to the other gigs. Bradfield also performed at the 2006 V Festival in late August. He embarked on his first full UK tour – consisting of 15 dates – in October. A second single, "An English Gentleman", was lifted from The Great Western before the tour and entered the UK chart at No. 31 on 1 October 2006.

The second album by Bradfield, Even in Exile, was confirmed in March 2020 to NME alongside the announcement of a 2021 Manics album. That June, the album was confirmed to be inspired by the life and death of Chilean communist activist Víctor Jara, with lyrics written as unpublished poetry by Patrick Jones. Two tracks, "There'll Come a War" and the instrumental "Seeking the Room With the Three Windows" were released the same day. The next week, the album was given a title and date alongside the launch of its first single, "The Boy From the Plantation", which debuted on Steve Lamacq's show on BBC Radio 6 Music. The album was released on 14 August 2020 on digital, CD, cassette, and vinyl and entered the UK charts at No. 6, giving Bradfield his first solo top 10 album.

Personal life 
Despite having once said "I always get bored of the company of women really quickly", he married the band's PR agent Mylène Halsall in a ceremony in Florence, Italy on 11 July 2004. The couple have two children. He is a supporter of Cardiff Blues and Nottingham Forest. In 2015, Bradfield and fellow Manic Sean Moore went to Patagonia in aid of the Velindre charity.

Musical equipment

Guitars 

Gibson Les Paul Custom
Gibson Les Paul Junior
Gibson Flying V
Gibson ES-330
Gibson ES-335
Gibson Explorer
Gibson J-45
Fender Telecaster
Fender Thinline Telecaster
Fender Jazzmaster
Fender Stratocaster
Fender Starcaster
Gretsch 6120 Chet Atkins model
Gretsch White Falcon
Guild Black Star
Burns 12 string model
Rickenbacker 330
Rickenbacker 360
Gordon Smith GS-1 double cutaway
Fret-King Ventura 60SSH

Amplifiers 

Fender Twin
Fender Hot Rod DeVille
Trace Elliot Speed Twin
Blackstar Artisan 30
Orange Amp head
Orange cabinet
Marshall JCM 900
Vox AC30
Mesa\Boogie Lone star Special

Discography

With Manic Street Preachers

Solo discography

Studio albums
 The Great Western (24 July 2006) – #22
 The Chamber: Original Motion Picture Soundtrack (10 March 2017)
 Even in Exile (14 August 2020) – #6

Singles
 "That's No Way to Tell a Lie" (10 July 2006) – #18
 "An English Gentleman" (25 September 2006) – #31
 "The Boy From the Plantation" (2 July 2020)

Collaborations
 "Lopez" (1996) with 808 State on album Don Solaris
 "Inertia Creeps" (1998) with Massive Attack, remix for Inertia Creeps single
 "I'm Left, You're Right, She's Gone" (1999) with Tom Jones on album Reload
 "Commemoration And Amnesia" (1999) with Patrick Jones, 2 tracks
 "Tongues for a Stammering Time" (2009) with Patrick Jones, 4 tracks
 "Turn No More" (2017) with Public Service Broadcasting on their album Every Valley

Production discography
 1996: Northern Uproar – Northern Uproar (studio album)
 1997: Kylie Minogue – Impossible Princess (studio album, co-producer on 2 tracks)
 1999: Tom Jones – Reload (studio album, co-producer on 1 track)
 2004: Johnny Boy – "You Are The Generation That Bought More Shoes And You Get What You Deserve" (single)

References

Bibliography

External links 

 Official Manic Street Preachers Site
 James Dean Bradfield biography from BBC Wales

1969 births
Living people
Alternative rock guitarists
Alternative rock singers
Lead guitarists
Manic Street Preachers members
People from Blackwood, Caerphilly
People from Pontypool
Welsh male singers
Welsh rock guitarists
Welsh rock singers
Welsh songwriters
Welsh republicans